Paradise is a city in Wise County, Texas, United States. The population was 475 in 2020.

According to tradition, the area was a cowboy's "paradise", hence the name.

In 1985, Blue Bell Ice Cream filmed a television commercial in Paradise, TX.  The commercial starred some residents of the town.

Geography

Paradise is located at  (33.150340, –97.688728). According to the United States Census Bureau, the city has a total area of 2.0 square miles (5.2 km), all of it land.

Demographics

As of the 2020 United States census, there were 475 people, 190 households, and 125 families residing in the city.

Education
The City of Paradise is served by the Paradise Independent School District.

References

External links
 Handbook of Texas Online article about Paradise, Texas
 Official City of Paradise, Texas Website

Cities in Wise County, Texas
Cities in Texas
Dallas–Fort Worth metroplex